Serafín Aedo Renieblas, (11 November 1908 – 14 October 1988) was a Spanish international footballer from Baracaldo in the Basque Country who played professionally as a defender in Spain, Mexico and Argentina between 1930 and 1949.

Career

Club career
In 1930 Aedo joined his first club Union Sport de San Vicente, which played in the third tier of Biscayan football. In 1931 he moved to Baracaldo CF, and then in 1933 to Real Betis where he teamed up for the first time with fellow Basque Pedro Areso. The pair made a formidable defense, helping Betis win La Liga in the 1934-35 season.

It has been claimed that he joined FC Barcelona in 1936, and that due to the outbreak of the Spanish Civil War he was not able to play an official match for them. However others claim that he never signed for Barcelona and that he remained a player for Real Betis until the outbreak of the civil war. During the 1938-39 season he played for Club Deportivo Euzkadi in the Mexican league. In 1939 he joined Club España, also in Mexico, where he played until his retirement in 1949, except for one year he spent playing for River Plate in Argentina.

After retiring as a player he went on to work as a coach at Club España.

International career
Aedo earned 4 caps for the Spanish national side in 1935 and 1936. From 1937 to 1939 he was part of the Basque Country national team which toured Europe and the Americas.

Other work
On retiring from football he opened a shop in Mexico City selling photographic materials, before later becoming an insurance broker.

Personal life
He married Miren Anúzita Zubizarreta and had three children, Miren, Jon Andoni and Angel.

His grandchild Jon Andoni Aedo Donohue played for the Mexico U-23 team in the Ponce 1993 Centro American games and won a silver medal.

References

External links
 

1908 births
1988 deaths
Footballers from Barakaldo
Association football defenders
Spanish expatriate footballers
Spanish footballers
Barakaldo CF footballers
Real Betis players
Real Club España footballers
Club Atlético River Plate footballers
Expatriate footballers in Argentina
Expatriate footballers in Mexico
Spain international footballers
La Liga players
Liga MX players
Spanish expatriate sportspeople in Mexico
Spanish emigrants to Mexico
Basque Country international footballers